The Eyalet of Adrianople or Edirne or Çirmen was constituted from parts of the eyalets of Silistra and Rumelia in 1826. 

It was one of the first Ottoman provinces to become a vilayet after an administrative reform in 1865, and by 1867 it had been reformed into the Vilayet of Adrianople.

Administrative division
The eyalet comprised almost all of the historical geographical region of Thrace, and comprised the following subdivisions (sanjaks or livas):

 Sanjak of Nevahi-i Erbaa (capital: Çatalca)
 Sanjak of Tekfürtaği (Rodosto) or Vize
 Sanjak of Gelibolu (Gallipoli)
 Sanjak of Edirne (Adrianople)
 Sanjak of Filibe (mod. Plovdiv)
 Sanjak of Islimiye (mod. Sliven) or Eski Zagra (Stara Zagora)

The sanjaks were further subdivided into 50 kazas or prefectures.

References

Eyalets of the Ottoman Empire in Europe
Ottoman Greece
History of Western Thrace
History of Çanakkale Province
History of Edirne Province
History of Kırklareli Province
History of Tekirdağ Province
1826 establishments in the Ottoman Empire
1867 disestablishments in the Ottoman Empire